Of Ruine or Some Blazing Starre - The Broken Heart of Man is an album by English band Current 93. Although musically one of Current 93's gentlest albums it is also lyrically very dark, prominently featuring the motif of blood, menstrual and otherwise. David Tibet states in the liner notes that all songs should be regarded as one piece of music; indeed, the album is similar to a stream-of-consciousness narrative, and several tracks contain similar - and in some cases, identical - musical themes. For example, the last three tracks were intended as a single piece, and are often performed live as such. Portions of the song are also musically identical to the Thunder Perfect Mind-era live song "Imperium V", which serves as a lyrical prelude as well.

Track listing
 "A Voice from Catland"  – 0:22
 "Steven and I in the Field of Stars"  – 2:56
 "The Teeth of the Winds of the Sea"  – 7:15
 "Moonlight, You Will Say"  – 5:19
 "Into the Bloody Hole I Go"  – 1:01
 "The Darkly Splendid World"  – 0:51
 "The Cloud of Unknowing"  – 7:28
 "Let Us Go to the Rose"  – 5:17
 "All the World Makes Great Blood"  – 3:55
 "The Great, Bloody and Bruised Veil of the World"  – 4:17
 "Into the Menstrual Night I Go"  – 1:14
 "Dormition and Dominion"  – 6:19
 "So: This Empire Is Nothing"  – 1:08
 "This Shining Shining World"  – 2:51

Personnel
Michael Cashmore - guitars, bass, drums, glockenspiel, sounds, additional mixing
Phoebe Cheshire - spoken vocals, sung vocals
Steven Stapleton - guitars, drones, bric-a-brac arrangements, mixing
David Tibet - vocals, sounds, additional mixing
David Kenny - engineering
Starspace - bass (track 4)

Current 93 albums
1994 albums
Durtro albums